is the Japanese word for amber. 

Kohaku (琥珀) may refer to:

Music 
 Kohaku, a song by Mikuni Shimokawa

Characters 
 Kohaku (Dr. Stone), a character in the manga series Dr. Stone
 Kohaku (InuYasha), a character in InuYasha
 Kohaku (Tsukihime), a character in Tsukihime
 Kohaku Ōtori or Unity-chan, a mascot of Unity (game engine)
 Spirit of the Kohaku River (Haku), a character in Spirited Away
 Kohaku (In Another World with My Smartphone), a white tiger character also known as the White Monarch in In Another World with My Smartphone
 Kohaku, an angel and lead character in Wish
 Kohaku Oukawa, a singer in the unit Crazy:B. A character in Ensemble Stars!

See also 
 Kōhaku (disambiguation) (紅白), red and white